Bishop Street (also known as Piskuplya,  – ancient form of "bishop's") was the main street of the Novgorod Detinets in the Middle Ages. The street was buried by the 18th century, its precise location is a subject of considerable historical and archeological research.

The earliest attempts to locate the street date to early 19th century, when Eugene Bolkhovitinov placed the early wooden Cathedral of St. Sophia (ca. 989) on Piskuplya, high up on the bank of Volkhov river, behind the  built in the 18th century.

In 1938 A. A. Strokov and  directed archaeological excavations near the Savior's gatehouse (built in end of the 15th century), when a section of a wood-paved street was unearthed at a depth of 1.9 m. Since these archeologists expected one end of Piskuplya to be located next to Saviour gate, they had identified the pavement with this street and dated its lowest level as 10th century construction, out of total 15 levels. An attempt to find continuation of Piskuplya near the Church of Andrew Stratelates in 1940 failed.

Тhe chronicles date the street back to at least 1049, as they mention that the wooden Cathedral of St. Sophia was located on this street. The wooden building burned down and was replaced by the current stone one by 1049. Valentin Yanin in 1977 identified this placement as an error made by a 15th-century scribe.

Yanin in 1982 suggested that Piskuplya ran between Fedorovskaya and South towers of the Detinets, and the wooden Sophia cathedral was located at its southern end.

References

Sources 
 
 
 
 
 
 
 
 

Historic Monuments of Novgorod and Surroundings
Archaeological sites in Russia